The National Transitional Council (NTC) was a transitional government established in the First Libyan Civil War. The rebel forces overthrew the Libyan Arab Jamahiriya of Muammar Gaddafi. The NTC governed Libya for a period of ten months after the end of the war, holding elections to a General National Congress on 7 July 2012, and handing power to the newly elected assembly on 8 August.

The formation of the NTC was announced in the city of Benghazi on 27 February 2011 with the purpose to act as the "political face of the revolution". On 5 March 2011, the council issued a statement in which it declared itself to be the "only legitimate body representing the people of Libya and the Libyan state". An executive board, chaired by Mahmoud Jibril, was formed by the council on 23 March 2011 after being de facto assembled as an "executive team" since 5 March 2011. The NTC issued a Constitutional Declaration in August 2011 in which it set up a road-map for the transition of the country to a constitutional democracy with an elected government.

The council gained international recognition as the legitimate governing authority in Libya and occupied the country's seat at the United Nations. In referring to the Libyan state, the council used simply "Libya". The UN formally recognized the country as "Libya" in September 2011, based on a request from the Permanent Mission of Libya citing the Libyan interim Constitutional Declaration of 3 August 2011. In November 2011, the ISO 3166-1 was altered to reflect the new country name "Libya" in English, "Libye (la)" in French.

Background

Uprising and civil war

After popular movements overturned the rulers of Tunisia and Egypt, Libya's immediate neighbours to the west and east, Libya experienced a full-scale uprising beginning in February 2011. By 20 February, the unrest had spread to Tripoli. Much of Libya had slipped out of Gaddafi's control, falling to anti-Gaddafi forces. Eastern Libya, centered around the second largest city and vital port of Benghazi, was firmly under the control of the opposition. The opposition began to organise themselves into a functioning government. Anti-Gaddafi forces marched on Sirte (Gaddafi's hometown) on 28 September 2011. Gaddafi loyalists delayed the attack with the use of their snipers. The fight for Sirte ended on 20 October with the capture of the town and the death of Colonel Gaddafi.

Early efforts to form a government

On 24 February 2011, politicians, former military officers, tribal leaders, academics and businessmen held a meeting in the eastern city of Bayda. The meeting was chaired by former justice minister Mustafa Abdul Jalil, who quit the Jamahiriya government a few days before. The delegates discussed proposals for interim administration with many delegates asking for UN intervention in Libya. The podium at the meeting displayed the pre-Jamahiriya flag.

On 25 February, Al Jazeera TV reported that talks were taking place between "personalities from eastern and western Libya" to form an interim government for the post-Gaddafi era. The following day, former justice minister Mustafa Abdul Jalil was announced to be leading the process of forming an interim body, to be based in Benghazi. Jalil stated that "Gaddafi alone bore responsibility for the crimes that have occurred" in Libya; he also insisted on the unity of Libya and that Tripoli was the national capital. The efforts to form an alternative government have been supported by the Libyan ambassador in the United States, Ali Suleiman Aujali. The Libyan deputy ambassador to the United Nations, Ibrahim Omar Al Dabashi, stated that he supported a new alternative government "in principle".

Establishment of a national council

A National Transitional Council was formed on 27 February to act as "the political face of the revolution". Its spokesman, Abdul Hafiz Ghoga, made clear at the launch press conference that the national council was not a provisional government and added that the newly formed council was not in contact with foreign governments and did not want them to intervene. He later clarified that an airstrike mandated by the United Nations would not be considered a foreign intervention.

An Al Jazeera journalist in Benghazi reported that a fully fledged interim government would not be formed until Tripoli was under opposition control. This contradicted Jalil's statement of the previous day about the formation of a provisional government. These comments were later clarified by the council as Jalil's "personal views".

On 5 March, the council issued a statement in which it declared itself to be the "sole representative of all Libya". Mustafa Abdul Jalil was named as chairman of the council.

On 10 March, France became the first country to recognise the council as Libya's only legitimate government.

Formation of an executive board
On 23 March, the council established an executive board to act as a transitional government for Libya. Jibril, who had served as chairman of the informal "executive team" since 5 March, was appointed as chairman of that board, stating that council would serve as the "legislative body", and the new Executive Board would serve as the "executive body". Jibril led the meeting and negotiations with French President Nicolas Sarkozy, a meeting that resulted in France officially recognizing the council as the sole representative of the Libyan people.

Instability in 2012
In mid-January 2012, protesters against the NTC stormed its Benghazi headquarters, demanding greater transparency on expenditures, that Gaddafi-era officials be sacked, and that Islamic sharia law be the source of the country's future constitution. Jalil was in the building, but slipped out the back before protesters broke in and stole computers and furniture. A few days earlier, Abdul Hafiz Ghoga, vice president of the NTC, was surrounded and jostled by a group of university students in Benghazi, before being pulled to safety by supporters.

Dissolution
In a ceremony on 8 August 2012—held in the evening due to the daytime fast of Ramadan—the NTC formally transferred power to the General National Congress. Jalil stepped down as chairman, passing the position to the GNC's oldest member, Mohammed Ali Salim. The NTC was then dissolved, while the GNC members took their oath of office, led by Salim.

Hundreds of people gathered in Tripoli's Martyrs' Square with candles symbolizing reconciliation. The date of the transfer—20 Ramadan on the Islamic calendar—had also been selected for symbolic reasons, as 20 Ramadan the previous year had fallen on 20 August, the date that the rebels attacked Tripoli, leading to Gaddafi's flight. As Jalil addressed the crowd, attendees chanted "Allahu Akbar!" or another phrase meaning "The blood of martyrs will not go wasted!"

According to BBC News, the transfer was "the first peaceful transition of power in Libya's modern history", meaning the history since the end of the monarchy.

Aims and objectives

The "Declaration of the founding of the National Transitional Council" stated that the main aims of the council were as follows:

Ensure the safety of the national territory and citizens
Coordination of national efforts to liberate the rest of Libya
Support the efforts of local councils to work for the restoration of normal civilian life
Supervision of the Military Council to ensure the achievement of the new doctrine of the Libyan People's Army in the defense of the people and to protect the borders of Libya.
Facilitate the election of a constituent assembly to draft a new constitution for the country; be put to a popular referendum
Form a transitional government to pave the holding of free elections
Guide the conduct of foreign policy, and the regulation of relations with other countries and international and regional organizations, and the representation of the Libyan people

In another statement clarifying the goals for a post-Gaddafi Libya, the council committed itself an eight-point plan to hold free and fair elections, draft a national constitution, form political and civil institutions, uphold intellectual and political pluralism, and guarantee citizens' inalienable human rights and the ability of free expression of their aspirations. The council also emphasized its rejection of racism, intolerance, discrimination, and terrorism. Article 1 further declares Tripoli the state capital and Arabic the official language while reserving the linguistic and cultural rights of ethnic minorities as well as the freedom of religion for religious minorities.

The stated aim of the NTC was to form a de jure interim government based in Tripoli and hold elections for a General National Congress to replace it. The GNC would then elect a prime minister, appoint a Constituent Assembly to draft a constitution subject to its approval by the Public National Conference (PNC) and by referendum, and then oversee free elections for a representative government.

Structure and membership

Legislative body

The National Transitional Council claimed to be, and was widely recognized as, the "only legitimate body representing the people of Libya and the Libyan state". Starting off at 33 members, it rose to 51, with proposals to increase its size further to 75 or even 125.

Al Jazeera English reported that each city or town under opposition control will be given five seats on the new council and that contact will be established with new cities that come under opposition control to allow them to join the council. The identities of members of the council were not disclosed at the launch conference. Human Rights lawyer Hafiz Ghoga was the spokesperson for the new council. An Al Jazeera English journalist in Benghazi stated that Mustafa Abdul Jalil still had a leadership role within the new council. The council declared that Jalil was the head of the council. The council met formally for the first time on 5 March 2011 when it was announced that the council had 33 members. The names of some of the members were kept secret to prevent threats to their families that were still in Gaddafi-held areas of Libya.

In September 2011, some of the NTC's members were in Benghazi, while some had moved to the de jure capital Tripoli. On 8 September, the head of government Mahmoud Jibril became the highest-ranking NTC official yet to move to Tripoli. Prior to Jibril's relocation, Deputy Chairman Ali Tarhouni was the de facto leader of the NTC in Tripoli.

Members

The members of the council included:

Council members: 
	Mustafa Abdul Jalil – chairman of the council
	Mustafa Honi – vice chairman of the council
	Zubeir Ahmed El-Sharif – Political Prisoners representative
	Omar El-Hariri – Military Council representative
City Representatives: 

	Hassan Fadeel – City of Ajdabiya
	Salih Dirssi – City of Bayda
	Ahmed Dayikh – City of Bayda
	Mustafa Houni – City of Jufra
	Abd al-Qadr Minsar – City of Khoms
	Emadaldeen Nussayr – City of Zawiya
	Khaled Nassrat – City of Zawiya
	AbdAllah Turki – City of Zintan
	Mukhtar Jadal – City of Ajaylat
	Ahmed Zway – City of Kufra
	Mustafa Lindi – City of Kufra
	Abdullah Moussa Al-Mayhoub – City of Quba
	Taher Dyab – City of Marj
	Mussa Balkami – City of Ubari
	Mohamed ZaynAbideen – Lower Nafusa
	Fathi Mohammed Baja – City of Benghazi
	Ahmed Al-Abbar – City of Benghazi
	Salwa Fawzi El-Deghali – City of Benghazi
	Khaled Sayih – City of Benghazi
	Mansour Kikhia – City of Benghazi
	Intisar Ageeli – City of Benghazi
	Abd al-Basset Naama – City of Tarhuna
	Ihbaybil Doii – City of Jadu
	Ashour Bourashed – City of Derna
	Khaled Ahmed ShikShik – City of Zliten
	Othman BenSassi – City of Zuwara
	Abd al-Majeed Sayf-alNasser – City of Sabha
	Mohamed Rimash – City of Sirte
	Fraj Shoeib – City of Shahhat
	Ali al-Juwani – City of Sabratha
	Farhat Shirshari – City of Sorman
	Othman Mgayrhi – City of Tobruk
	Alameen Bilhaj – City of Tripoli
	Abd al-Razzag Aradi – City of Tripoli
	Mohamed Hrayzi – City of Tripoli
	Abd al-Razzag Abuhajar – City of Tripoli
	Ali Shitwi – City of Tripoli
	AbdAllah Banoon – City of Tripoli
	Abd al-Nasser Salem – City of Tripoli
	Abd al-Basset Abadi – City of Tripoli
	Abd al-Nasser Nafaa – City of Tripoli
	Salih Darhub – City of Tripoli
	Osama AbuKraza – City of Tripoli
	Milad Oud – City of Tripoli
	Ali Manaa – City of Ghadames
	Idris AbuFayid – City of – Gharyan
	Jamal Issa – City of Kabaw
	Ali Gamma – City of Murzuk
	Abd al-Hadi Shaweesh – City of Murzuk
	Ramadan Khaled – City of Msallata
	Ibrahim BenGhasheer – City of Misrata
	Suleiman Al-Fortia – City of Misrata
	Mohamed Elmuntasser – City of Misrata
	Salem Gnan – City of Nalut
	Hassan Sghayir – City of al Shatii
	Saad Nasr – City of al Shatii
	Abd al-Razzaq Madi – City of Yafran
	Mubarak al-Futmani – City of Bani Walid

AbdAllah Banoon of Tripoli resigned to form a political party.

Executive Board
On 5 March 2011, a crisis committee was set up to act as the executive arm of the council. An Executive Board was announced on 23 March 2011. It originally had 15 members, but a minor reorganisation apparently removed the post of Military Affairs from the council proper and created a successor position for Defence on the board, expanding the bureau to 16 members.

The executive board was dismissed on 8 August 2011 due to administrative mistakes in investigating the assassination in July of Free Libyan Army commander General Abdel-Fatah Younes. Chairman Mahmoud Jibril, the only designated member of the executive board who was not fired, was tasked with forming a new Board.

Members (March–August 2011)
Prior to the re-shuffle in August 2011, the board members were:

Mahmoud Jibril – Chairman and head of international affairs
Ali Al-Issawi – vice-chairman
Ahmed Hussein Al-Darrat – Internal Affairs and Local Government
Jalal al-Digheily – Defence (formerly Military Affairs)
Mahmoud Shammam – Media
Naji Barakat – Health
Mohammed Al-Allagi – Justice and Human Rights
Hania Al-Gumati – Social Welfare
Abdullah Shamia – Economic
Ali Tarhouni – Finance and Oil
Anwar Fituri – Transportation and Communications
Abulgassim Nimr – Environment
Atia Lawgali – Culture and Community
Abdulsalam Al-Shikhy – Religious Affairs and Endowments
Ahmed Al-Jehani – Reconstruction and Infrastructure
Suliman El-Sahli – Education

Members (October 2011)
A new cabinet was unveiled in early October 2011, though not all of its members were announced at once. Individuals confirmed to be part of the new board included Mahmoud Jibril as prime minister, Ali Tarhouni as deputy prime minister, and Jalal al-Digheily as defence minister. On 23 October, Jibril resigned as Mustafa Abdul Jalil declared an end to the Libyan civil war, and Abdurrahim El-Keib succeeded him as prime minister on 31 October.

The executive board was dissolved on 22 November 2011 as per the Interim constitution which stated that the executive board must be dissolved upon the formation of the Interim Government.

Interim government
El-Keib unveiled the interim government on 22 November 2011:

Abdurrahim El-Keib – Prime Minister
Mustafa A.G. Abushagur- Deputy Prime Minister
Hamza Abu Faris – Minister of Awqaf & Islamic Affairs
Ali Ashour – Minister of Justice
Anwar Fituri – Minister of Communications and Information Technology
Mustafa Rugibani – Minister of Labor
Fatima Hamroush – Minister of Health
Fawzi Abdel A'al – Minister of Interior
Awad Beroin – Minister of Energy
Taher Sharkas – Minister of Trade and Commerce
Sulaiman al-Sahli – Minister of Education
Ashour Bin Khayal – Minister of Foreign Affairs
Osama al-Juwali – Minister of Defense
Isa Tuwaijir – Minister of Planning
Mabrouka Jibril – Minister of Social Affairs
Abdulrahman Ben Yezza – Minister of Oil
Hasan Zaglam – Minister of Finance
AbdulHamid BuFruja – Minister of Agriculture
Mahmoud Fetais – Minister of Industry
Naeem Gheriany – Minister of Scientific Research and Higher Education
Ahmed Attiga – Investment Authority
Abdul Rahman Habil – Minister of Culture and Civil Society
Awad al-Baraasi – Minister of Electricity
Ashraf bin Ismail – Martyrs Authority 
Mohammad Harari – Minister of Local Government
Ibrahim Alsagoatri – Minister of Housing
Yousef Wahashi – Minister of Transportation
Fathi Terbil – Minister of Youth
Ibrahim Eskutri – Minister of Construction

Local government
During the war, in opposition-held Benghazi, a 15-member "local committee" made up of lawyers, judges and respected local people was formed in order to provide civic administration and public services within the city. Residents have organised to direct traffic and collect refuse. Many shops and businesses have opened again. A newspaper and two local radio stations were also established.

Similar "local committees" were formed in other cities controlled by opposition groups.

Commercial bodies
The council established the following commercial bodies to manage its financial affairs:
 The Central Bank of Benghazi – to act as the "monetary authority competent in monetary policies in Libya"
 Libyan Oil Company – to act as the "supervisory authority on oil production and policies in the country"

Armed forces

The anti-Gaddafi forces were Libyan armed forces which were constituted during the 2011 war by defected military members and armed citizens in order to engage in battle against remaining members of the Jamahiriya's armed forces, hired mercenaries and paramilitary loyal to the rule of Muammar Gaddafi. The National Liberation Army, formerly known as the Free Libyan Army, was the NTC's military arm, with the small Free Libyan Air Force operating assets including captured and defected fighter jets and helicopters.

Omar El-Hariri was the first military affairs minister the NTC named, holding that position from 23 March 2011 forward. By 19 May 2011, however, Jalal al-Digheily had replaced El-Hariri. Then on 8 August 2011, Digheily along with 14 other members of the executive board were fired and the position left vacant, but was reappointed in early October 2011 after continuing in the role of interim defense minister for almost two months. Then on 22 November 2011, the executive board was dissolved for the formation of the Interim Government and Osama al-Juwali became the new Defense Minister.

On 1 April 2011, Abdul Fatah Younis was announced as commander of the NTC's forces, in an attempt to form an organized fighting structure due to a string of failures. Younis was killed in an attack on 29 July 2011 which was variously blamed on pro-Gaddafi agents, rogue rebel militiamen, and the NTC itself. Suleiman Mahmoud, Younis's top lieutenant, replaced him as army commander.

Foreign relations

In July 2011, the Libya Contact Group of representatives of many nations announced its participants' agreement to deal with the National Transitional Council as the "legitimate governing authority in Libya". The council also received the backing of the Arab League and the European Union. On 16 September 2011, the United Nations General Assembly voted to award Libya's UN seat to the NTC. On 20 September 2011, the African Union officially recognised the NTC as the legitimate representative of Libya.

Mohammed El Senussi, the pretender to the throne of Libya, also voiced his support for the NTC.

While NTC forces were working to secure military victory on the ground, the NTC's chairman, Mustafa Abdul Jalil, was working to foster good diplomatic relations overseas. Before Gaddafi was killed Abdul Jalil negotiated a deal with the British government to pay millions in compensation to victims of IRA attacks that used Jamahiriya-supplied arms.

Military intervention

United Nations Security Council Resolution 1973 authorised a multi-national effort to establish a no-fly zone. On 19 March, British, French and US air forces began attacking targets in Gaddafi-controlled Libya, thereby initiating the UN military intervention. Operations were led by NATO under Operation Unified Protector, after initially being led by a joint UK, US and French command. Non-NATO states such as Jordan, Qatar, Sweden, and the United Arab Emirates also contributed to the military mission.

See also
 General National Congress
 Supreme Council of the Armed Forces

References

External links

libyamission-un.org, official website of Libya's mission to the United Nations

Government of Libya
 
First Libyan Civil War
2011 establishments in Libya
Organizations of the Arab Spring
Provisional governments
Political history of Libya